Probarbus labeamajor is a species of ray-finned fish in the family Cyprinidae.
It is found in Cambodia, Laos, and Thailand.

References

Cyprinid fish of Asia
Fish described in 1992
Taxonomy articles created by Polbot